FK Senta (Serbian Cyrillic: ФК Сента) is a football club based in Senta, Serbia.

History
The club was formed in 1905 as ZAK, Zentai AK (Zentai Atletikai Klub)  At the end of the First World War, the region of Bačka become part of the Kingdom of Serbs, Croats and Slovenes, renamed into Yugoslavia in 1929 and the club competed in the Subotica Football Subassociation.

In the Second World War, Hungary took control over Senta, and the club competes in the Hungarian Second League, finishing in 11th in season 1941/42, 12th in season 1942/43 and 9th in season 1943/44.

In 1945 Senta would be part of Yugoslavia again, and the club achieved its major success between 1950 and 1952 when playing in the Serbian Republic League, one of the six regional third national tier leagues. Afterwards and during the 1960s the club competed in the Vojvodina League (4th national tier). Several well-known footballers had played in the club, the most famous being Novak Roganović, a Yugoslav Olympic player in the 1962 Olympic games held in Rome. Another very famous player, Mladen Krstajić had his first senior appearances in this club, having afterwards continued his career playing with OFK Kikinda, FK Partizan, Schalke 04 and Werder Bremen. In more recent times the club has usually competed in the Serbian League Vojvodina, the 3rd national tier.

References

External links
 Official website
 Club profile and squad at Srbijafudbal
 

Football clubs in Serbia
Football clubs in Vojvodina
Association football clubs established in 1905
1905 establishments in Serbia